The 1941 season was the thirtieth season for Santos FC.

References

External links
Official Site 

Santos
1942
1941 in Brazilian football